Jackson Jose Lucas (born 2 March 1984) is a Brazilian former football defender. His only experience outside Brazil is in the Romanian top division Liga I at Pandurii Târgu Jiu.

References

External links

Jackson at playmakerstats.com (English version of ogol.com.br)

1981 births
Living people
Brazilian footballers
Association football defenders
Associação Portuguesa de Desportos players
Ituano FC players
Nacional Atlético Clube (SP)
Guaratinguetá Futebol players
São José Esporte Clube players
Red Bull Brasil players
Santa Cruz Futebol Clube players
Marília Atlético Clube players
Esporte Clube Santo André players
Centro Sportivo Alagoano players
Independente Futebol Clube players
Esporte Clube Pelotas players
Campeonato Brasileiro Série C players
Brazilian expatriate footballers
Expatriate footballers in Romania
Brazilian expatriate sportspeople in Romania
Liga I players
CS Pandurii Târgu Jiu players
People from São Bernardo do Campo
Footballers from São Paulo (state)